The pecten or pecten oculi is a comb-like structure of blood vessels belonging to the choroid in the eye of a bird. It is a non-sensory, pigmented structure that projects into the vitreous humor from the point where the optic nerve enters the eyeball. The pecten is believed to both nourish the retina and control the pH of the vitreous body. High level of enzyme alkaline phosphatase activity in pecten oculi has been linked to transport of nutrient molecules from highly vascularized pecten oculi into vitreous and then into retinal cells for nourishment.  It is present in all birds and some reptiles.

In the vertebrate eye, there are blood vessels in front of the retina, partially obscuring the image. The pecten helps to solve this problem by greatly reducing the number of blood vessels in the retina and leading to the extremely sharp eyesight of birds such as hawks. The pigmentation of the pecten is believed to protect the blood vessels against damage from ultraviolet light. Stray light absorption by melanin granules of pecten oculi is also considered to give rise to small increments in temperature of pecten and eye; this may offer increased metabolic rate to optimize eye physiology in low temperatures at high-altitude flights.  The structure varies across bird species and is conical in the kiwi, vaned in the ostrich and pleated in most other birds.

See also 
 Conus papillaris, a similar structure found in reptiles

References

Birds